Chhota Jagulia High School a Bengali medium co-educational higher secondary school was established in 1847. It has arrangements for teaching from class V to XII.

See also
Education in India
List of schools in India
Education in West Bengal

References

External links 
 Official website

High schools and secondary schools in West Bengal
Educational institutions established in 1847
1847 establishments in British India